Maliyadeva Adarsha Maha Vidyalaya is a Buddhist mixed school in Sri Lanka, located in the North Western Province, Sri Lanka.

The school currently has a student population of over 4,200 and a staff of nearly 200 teachers. The classes are held from grade 1 to grade 13.

History 
On 27 February 1978, school, then known as "Maliyadewa Adarsha Prathamika Vidyalaya“, opened with 123 pupils. In 1982 the school renamed “Maliyadewa Adarsha Kanishta Vidyalaya”. In 1987 the first batch of students sat for the O/L exams, with more than 91% passing.  Then in 1988 A/L classes were started in all streams at once, and the school was renamed “Maha Vidyalaya”.

Education and Classes
The school conducts 95 classes which are divided into three types

Primary Section
Primary Section currently have about 25 Classes. Grade 1 To 5 is Primary section.

Special education unit
This unit consist about 4 classes, which provide education to student with special needs.

Grade 6 to Grade 11 Section 
This section currently has about 42 classes. And this section Consist Some Computer Lab and Science Lab too

A/L Section
Science Section
Commerce Section
Arts Section

Houses 
The students are divided into four houses according to their admission numbers. House names are derived from the past kings in Sri Lanka.

Thissa - Green colour   
Mahasen- Red colour     
Gemunu - Yellow colour  
Parakum- Blue Colour    

In the inter house sport meet the houses compete to win inter house games.

Past principals

 D. C. Ranasinghe 
 R. M. Jayawardana
 T. B. Siriwardana
 H. M. K. Banda
 K. A. D. T. Wijerathna
 H. M. Chandrasekara
 R. M. Gunasekara
 D. M. Thilakaratahna
 Somarathna Dasanayaka
 S. S. A. Amarasena
 W. M. Wasala Karunarathna
 S.M.D.U.Bandara

Battle of the Tuskers

The Battle of the Tuskers is an annual one day cricket encounter played between Maliyadeva Adarsha Maha Vidyalaya and Ibbagamuawa Central College at the Welagedara Stadium, Kurunegala.

The big match was not played in certain years for various reasons and was restarted in 2018.

See also
Kurunegala
Lists of schools in Sri Lanka
List of schools in North Western Province, Sri Lanka

References

External links
 School website

Schools in Kurunegala

Schools in Kurunegala District